Deadly Intentions... Again? is a 1991 American made-for-television thriller film and a sequel to the 1985 film Deadly Intentions.

Plot
After serving time for the attempted murder of his first wife, the main character, a doctor, begins plotting to kill his second.

Cast

Distribution 
 Harry Hamlin : Charles Raynor
 Joanna Kerns : Sally Raynor
 Fairuza Balk : Stacey
 Rochelle Greenwood : Nora
 Conchata Ferrell : Joanie
 Kevin McNulty : Doctor Uttley
 Bill Dow : Bill Garner
 Jenn Griffin : Ticket Agent
 Bernadette Leonard : Sheila
 Eileen Brennan : Charlotte Raynor

External links
 

1991 television films
1991 films
1991 crime thriller films
American thriller television films
Television sequel films
American docudrama films
American drama television films
Films directed by James Steven Sadwith
1990s American films